Beef plate (also known as the short plate) is a forequarter cut from the belly of the cow, just below the rib cut. It is typically a cheap, tough, and fatty meat. In U.K. butchery, this cut is considered part of the brisket.

It is used for short ribs and two kinds of steak - skirt and hanger. It may also be cured, smoked, and thinly sliced to make beef bacon.

The beef navel is the ventral part of the plate, and it is commonly used to make pastrami.

The remainder is usually used for ground beef.

References

Cuts of beef